General Mohammad Oufkir (14 May 1920 − 16 August 1972) was a Moroccan senior military officer who held many important governmental posts. It is believed that he was assassinated for his alleged role in the failed 1972 Moroccan coup attempt.

Biography

He studied at the Berber College of Azrou near Meknes. In 1939, he entered the Military Academy of Dar El Beida (Meknes), and in 1941, he enlisted as a reserve lieutenant in the French Army.

During World War II, he served with distinction in the French Expeditionary Corps (4th Regiment of Moroccan Tirailleurs) on the Italian front in 1944, where he won the Croix de Guerre. He was also awarded the Silver Star in 1944 by U.S. Army Major General Alfred M. Gruenther, General Mark W. Clark's chief of staff, after the Battle of Monte Cassino. After the war, he fought with the French Far East Expeditionary Corps in the First Indochina War from 1947 to 1949, where his bravery was dubbed "legendary". In 1949 he was promoted captain and named to the Legion d'Honneur.

As the right-hand man of King Hassan II in the 1960s and early 1970s, Oufkir led government supervision of politicians, unionists and the religious establishment. He forcefully repressed political protest through police and military clampdowns, pervasive government espionage, show trials, and numerous extralegal measures such as killings and forced disappearances. A feared figure in dissident circles, he was considered extraordinarily close to power. One of his most famous victims is believed to have been celebrated Moroccan politician Mehdi Ben Barka, who had "disappeared" in Paris in 1965. A French court convicted him of the murder.

In 1967, Oufkir was named interior minister, vastly increasing his power through direct control over most of the security establishment. After a failed republican military coup in 1971, he was named chief of staff and minister of defense, and set about purging the army and promoting his personal supporters. His domination of the Moroccan political scene was now near-complete, with the king ever more reliant on him to contain mounting discontent. L. Ron Hubbard and the Sea Org, the paramilitary upper eschelon of the Church of Scientology which had fled to Morocco after being denied entry to most European Mediterranean ports, sought to convert Oukfir by providing him with E-meters to use as lie detectors to apprehend coup participants. 

Oufkir was accused of plotting the 1972 Moroccan coup attempt against King Hassan II. Though official sources claimed that the general had committed suicide in response to the failure of the coup, his daughter, Malika Oufkir, writing in her book Stolen Lives, claims to have seen five bullet wounds in her father's body, all in positions not consistent with suicide. It is generally accepted outside of official circles that Oufkir was executed by forces loyal to the Moroccan monarchy.

On orders of the king, Oufkir's entire family was then sent to secret desert prison camps. They were not released until 1991, after American and European pressure on the government. After five years under close police supervision, they fled to France. This story is detailed by Oufkir's daughter Malika in the book Stolen Lives: Twenty Years in a Desert Jail. His wife Fatima and his son Raouf also published their accounts of the period.

Honours
 Officier de la Légion d'honneur (1949)
 Chevalier de la Légion d'honneur (1947)
 Croix de guerre 1939-1945
 Croix de guerre des théâtres d'opérations extérieures
 Silver Star

He was awarded a total of seven citations, including three palmes (citations in Army Orders).

See also
 Republicanism in Morocco
 Years of lead
 Makhzen

Sources
 Stephen Smith, Oufkir, un destin marocain, Hachette Littératures, 2002
 Malika Oufkir and Michèle Fitoussi (2001), Stolen Lives: Twenty Years in a Desert Jail, Miramax Books

Notes

External links
 BBC Article on Malika Oufkir and recorded interview
 Oprah Winfrey's Book Club The Oufkir family: Where are they now?
 ArabicNews On three Moroccan weeklies banned in 2000, after articles tied the ruling USFP party to Oufkir's plot

1920 births
Moroccan Berber politicians
Politics of Morocco
Human rights abuses in Morocco
1972 deaths
Government ministers of Morocco
Deaths by firearm in Morocco
Moroccan military personnel
French military personnel of World War II
People from Bouarfa, Morocco
Moroccan generals
People of Moroccan intelligence agencies
Berber Moroccans